Tricholoma borgsjoeënse, or , is a mushroom of the agaric genus Tricholoma.  It is found in Norway, Sweden, and Finland, where it grows among moss in Norway spruce forest. It was described as new to science in 2006.

See also
List of Tricholoma species
List of fungi by conservation status

References

borgsjoeënse
Fungi described in 2006
Fungi of Europe